Cladonia minisaxicola is a rare species of saxicolous (rock-dwelling) lichen in the family Cladoniaceae. Found in Bahia, Brazil, it was formally described as a new species in 2018 by lichenologists André Aptroot and Marcela Eugenia da Silva Cáceres. Cladonia minisaxicola is only known to occur at the type locality (part of the Chapada Diamantina mountains), and is only known from the type specimen. Although it differs from all other species of Cladonia in the form of its non-squamulose primary thallus, its position in that genus has been confirmed with molecular phylogenetic analysis. The specific epithet minisaxicola acknowledges its small size and saxicolous growth.

See also
List of Cladonia species

References

minisaxicola
Lichen species
Lichens described in 2018
Lichens of Northeast Brazil
Taxa named by André Aptroot
Taxa named by Marcela Cáceres